Temminck's seedeater (Sporophila falcirostris) is a species of bird in the family Thraupidae.

It is found in eastern South America, mainly in far northeastern Argentina and along the southeastern Brazilian coastline. Its natural habitats are subtropical or tropical moist lowland forest and subtropical or tropical moist montane forest. It is threatened by habitat loss.

This bird's common name commemorates the Dutch naturalist Coenraad Jacob Temminck.

References

Temminck's seedeater
Birds of Argentina
Birds of the Atlantic Forest
Temminck's seedeater
Taxonomy articles created by Polbot